Nightcrawler (Kurt Wagner) is a fictional superhero appearing in American comic books published by Marvel Comics, commonly in association with the X-Men. Created by writer Len Wein and artist Dave Cockrum, he debuted in the comic book Giant-Size X-Men #1 (May 1975).

Nightcrawler is a member of a fictional subspecies of humanity known as mutants, who possess an X-gene that can cause possible  physical mutations and in many cases grants some form of superhuman ability. Nightcrawler possesses superhuman agility, the ability to teleport, and adhesive hands and feet. His physical mutations include indigo-colored velvety fur which allows him to become nearly invisible in shadows, two-toed feet and three-fingered hands, yellow eyes, pointed ears and a prehensile tail. In Nightcrawler's earlier comic book appearances, he is depicted as being a happy-go-lucky practical joker and teaser, and a fan of swashbuckling fiction. Nightcrawler is a Catholic, and while this is not emphasized as much in his earlier comic book appearances, in later depictions Nightcrawler is more vocal about his faith.

Since his inception, Nightcrawler has had a regular presence in Marvel-related comic books and video games. He has been featured in a small number of the 1990s X-Men animated series episodes and was a regular on its successors, X-Men: Evolution and Wolverine and the X-Men. He was portrayed by Alan Cumming in the feature film X2 (2003), while Kodi Smit-McPhee played a younger version of Nightcrawler in X-Men: Apocalypse (2016), Deadpool 2 (2018) and Dark Phoenix (2019).

Nightcrawler is originally stated to be from a small village called Witzeldorf in the German state of Bavaria. In the X-Men animated series, it is said to be Neuherzl, and in the film X2, he makes repeated references to his time in the Munich circus, though it is never explicitly specified from where he originated.

Publication history
Dave Cockrum originally created Nightcrawler while he was in the United States Navy, stationed at Guam. He recounted: "I sat up one night in the middle of a typhoon because it was too noisy to sleep, so I stayed up and thought up this character. Originally, Nightcrawler was a demon from Hell who had flubbed a mission, and rather than go back and face punishment, he decided to stay up here in the human world. He was supposed to be the sidekick of another superhero character that I had created named The Intruder." At this point Nightcrawler wore trunks instead of a full costume, but otherwise looked identical to his final version.

Cockrum submitted the character to be part of a group of characters called The Outsiders (not to be confused with the later team The Outsiders), set in the universe of DC Comics' Legion of Super-Heroes series. As Nightcrawler had been rejected by DC, when Cockrum started work on the new X-Men in 1975, he brought the character's costume design (and overall unusual look) over to Marvel. Because editor Roy Thomas wanted the new X-Men to be a multinational group, it was decided to make Nightcrawler German.

Although an X-Men character for years, Nightcrawler did not get his own comic book title (written and drawn by Cockrum) until November 1985. In the four-issue limited series Nightcrawler, along with Lockheed, accidentally travel to several alternate dimensions, meeting strange beings such as the Bamfs. After various adventures, Nightcrawler and Lockheed manage to get home safely.

A second four-issue limited series was published in November 2002. Written by Chris Kipiniak and penciled by Matthew Dow Smith, it focuses upon Nightcrawler's decision to become a priest and his attempts to fight a group of slave traders.

In September 2004, the first Nightcrawler ongoing title was published by Marvel, written by Roberto Aguirre-Sacasa with covers and pencils by Darick Robertson. The series was canceled with issue twelve.

In 2014, a new Nightcrawler ongoing title commenced, written by Chris Claremont. This was also canceled with issue twelve.

Way of X
Nightcrawler starred in an ongoing book titled Way of X, written by Si Spurrier and illustrated by Bob Quinn. It was announced in January 2021 for an April 2021 debut as part of the X-Men line's Reign of X, following the conclusion of X of Swords crossover. It is billed as a smart, psychedelic tale about faith, science, culture, love and law.

The series featured the return of Legion and the threat of Onslaught to the mutant nation.

A one-shot titled X-Men: The Onslaught Revelation will served as the finale of the first chapter of the series.

Fictional character biography

Origin
Kurt Wagner was born with certain unusual physical characteristics, but his power of self-teleportation did not emerge until puberty. Margali Szardos, a sorceress and Roma queen, allegedly found Kurt an hour after his birth, in a small roadside shelter in the Black Forest with his father lying dead on the road outside. However, this claim was later called into question, and it was subsequently proven that Kurt's mother is Mystique (also known as Raven Darkholme), and his father is the demonic warlord Azazel. Mystique revealed that she threw him over the falls after a large mob learned of Kurt's existence, and Azazel admitted that he secretly saved his son from the fall, giving him to his lover and crony, Margali Szardos, to raise him. Margali took the baby to a small Bavarian circus named Herr Getmann's Traveling Menagerie where she worked as a fortune teller, as a cover for her activities as a sorceress. Wagner was never legally adopted by anyone, but he was raised by all the members of the circus, who had no prejudices against mutants, except for the ringmaster, Herr Max Getmann. However, Margali took up the role of Kurt's unofficial foster mother.

Kurt grew up happily in the circus, and his two closest friends were Margali's son Stefan and daughter Jimaine. Long before his teleportation power emerged, Wagner had tremendous natural agility, and by his adolescence, he had become the circus' star acrobat and aerial artist. Circus audiences assumed that he was a normal-looking human wearing a devil-like costume.

Years later, the Texas millionaire Amos Jardine, who ran a large circus based in Florida, heard of the circus for which Wagner worked and bought it. Jardine intended to move its best acts into his American circus; however, he demanded that Wagner be placed in the circus' freak show. Jardine drugged him to prevent escape, but a young mutant child with the ability to sense other mutants helped Kurt escape. Appalled, Wagner left and made his way toward Winzeldorf, Germany, where his foster brother Stefan was. He discovered that Stefan had gone mad and brutally slain several children. (It has since been stated that Stefan did not actually go mad, but slew the children because he had recognized them as disguised demons.) When they were younger, Stefan made Kurt promise to kill him if he ever took an innocent life. Two nights after leaving the circus, Wagner found Stefan and fought him, hoping to stop his rampage. In the course of the struggle, Stefan was killed.

X-Men

The villagers of Winzeldorf, who assumed from Kurt's appearance that he was the one who killed the children, attacked. They were about to kill him when they were all psychically paralyzed by Professor Charles Xavier, who came to recruit Wagner into the X-Men. Before they left for America, he and Xavier went to the Bavarian circus to explain to Margali about Stefan's death, but Margali was not there . With the codename Nightcrawler, Wagner becomes a member of the X-Men. Margali held Wagner responsible for murdering Stefan and created a facsimile of the hell from Dante's Inferno in which to punish him years later. Through the use of Doctor Strange's all-seeing Eye of Agamotto, she learned the truth, and she and Wagner were reconciled. Wagner was happily reunited with his foster sister Jimaine, who had moved to the United States and changed her name to Amanda Sefton, later becoming Kurt's girlfriend.

Sometime later, Nightcrawler fought Shagreen the Sorcerer and became lost in various dimensions, including the manifestation of a fairy tale his teammate Kitty Pryde (Shadowcat) had once told to Illyana Rasputin (Magik). It was there that Nightcrawler first encountered the Bamfs, strange creatures that resembled miniature versions of himself and who would occasionally appear during some of his future adventures.

Shortly after this, and once he had rejoined his teammates, a tactic designed to disable the super-Sentinel Nimrod backfired, and Kurt found himself at the mercies of an angry mob without his teleportation ability. He was rescued by Shadowcat, Colossus, and Magik but feared he had lost his ability for good. His power returned but left him drained and vulnerable when he used it, again leading to self-doubt about his value to the team. During the Mutant Massacre (the Marauders' assault on the Morlock tunnels), this exhaustion left him vulnerable to an attack from Riptide, which injured him into a coma.

Excalibur
While he recovers from these injuries, his fellow X-Men were apparently killed on a mission in Dallas. Not long after, Nightcrawler and teammates Shadowcat and Rachel Summers left to join Captain Britain in an adventure in the UK. They fought Gatecrasher's group of inter-dimensional mercenaries known as the Technet. The heroes worked together so well, they decided to form a group they named Excalibur. Captain Britain originally assumed leadership of the group, but Nightcrawler gradually took over the responsibility. When Captain Britain's and Meggan's relationship went through a rocky time, Nightcrawler became interested in Meggan, a feeling that was reciprocated but never consummated. During his time with Excalibur, he took charge of the Technet, renaming them his 'N-Men', and he became romantically involved with his teammate Cerise before she left to stand trial before the Shi'ar. Later, his former girlfriend, Amanda Sefton, joined the team and the two continued their previous relationship. She left the team to take control of Limbo, a task that kept her away from Earth, but the two remained close friends. Fearing it would be stolen from her, Amanda magically hid the Soulsword inside Nightcrawler's body.

Returning to the X-Men

For a time, Kitty Pryde and Nightcrawler express some resentment over the X-Men's failing to contact them after their supposed deaths. Following the wedding of Captain Britain and Meggan, Excalibur disbands and Nightcrawler returns to the X-Men with Shadowcat and Colossus. Yet, as soon as they return, they face a group of impostors following Cerebro, in the guise of Professor X.

Wanting to devote more time to the priesthood, Nightcrawler shares team leadership with Archangel. However, his work as a priest is retconned to be an illusion; he had, in fact, never attained priesthood. He has also met his half-brothers Nils Styger, alias Abyss, and Kiwi Black. With them, Nightcrawler defeated his father Azazel, who had tried to use him as a pawn in escaping his prison.

Later, Nightcrawler served as the new leader of the Uncanny X-Men team alongside Wolverine, Bishop, Psylocke, Cannonball, and Marvel Girl. In the last mission against the Foursaken, Nightcrawler took his team (except for Wolverine) to Central Park. He later helped Storm liberate Africa from her uncle's control.

Afterwards, Professor X recruited him, along with Darwin, Havok, Marvel Girl, Warpath, and Polaris, to participate in a space mission to stop Vulcan from laying waste to the Shi'ar empire. During the battle with Vulcan, Nightcrawler helped get the injured Professor X and Darwin back to their spaceship. While there, trying to save Professor X, Lilandra sent the ship on its way back to Earth, leaving half the team behind.

Kurt was still part of Professor X's team, helping Charles find Magneto before the government did, while the rest of the team searched for the Morlocks.

"House of M"
In the 2005 "House of M" storyline, Nightcrawler was part of Wolverine's S.H.I.E.L.D. team and helped Mystique track him down. After his memory returned, he assisted in the final confrontation against Magneto. Upon their return to the true reality, he rapidly teleported around the mansion to find Wolverine on Cyclops' orders, as both men worried that Wolverine would have lost his powers and therefore be vulnerable to metal poisoning caused by his adamantium skeleton.

"Messiah Complex"
When the first mutant since M-Day appeared, Cyclops sent Nightcrawler, Wolverine, Angel, Storm, and Colossus to find former Acolytes for information on the Marauders. It was predicted by Blindfold that Kurt would be seriously injured in the upcoming events, and indeed this came true when he was shot by the Marauder, Scalphunter. Kurt seemed to have nearly fully recovered from his injuries since he, along with Beast and the entire New X-Men team, is teleported to Muir Island by Pixie. He took part in the final battle.

Divided We Stand
Still recovering from his injuries, Kurt traveled through Europe along with Wolverine and Colossus. Kurt and Wolverine were currently involved in a "war of pranks," as Peter called it. One of the many pranks involved Logan hacking into Kurt's image inducer to make him look like Angelina Jolie, which resulted in a picture of Angelina and Peter appearing in assorted tabloid newspapers. The three of them traveled to Russia, where they visited the cemetery where Peter's family is buried. Afterward, they went to a local bar, where they discussed the recent loss of Kitty Pryde and the destruction of the X-Men. A fight occurred in the bar, during which their cover was blown. Soon after, the three of them were captured by the Russian government, which demanded to know why all their mutants were depowered and why Colossus, Wolverine, and Nightcrawler retained their abilities. After a battle with Omega Red, the three heroes returned to the US and rejoined the team, now living in San Francisco.

Manifest Destiny
Kurt, along with Wolverine and Karma ambushed the Hellfire Cult after a series of mutant related hate-crimes happened around San Francisco. He also took it upon himself to build a new chapel at Graymalkin Industries, the X-Men's new home and base of operations.

During a training session in the Danger Room, he revealed he was trying to keep himself distracted because whenever he had time to think, he couldn't help but think of Kitty, how the X-Men didn't need him, and how Pixie was a better teleporter than he was. After battling (unsuccessfully) several simulated villains, he reprogrammed the Danger Room to show Kitty. He confessed he was sorry he wasn't there for her and hugged the simulation and cried. The simulation of Kitty replied that she missed Kurt, too.

Nightcrawler briefly believed that he no longer had a role with the X-Men, especially due to Pixie's abilities in teleporting. A trip back to Germany renewed his conviction through an encounter with a boy cursed by gypsies into demonic form, a brush with Mephisto, and a romantic fling, before he returned to San Francisco to aid the X-Men against a foe they struggled with, lacking his help.

"Secret Invasion"
In the 2008 storyline "Secret Invasion," Nightcrawler fought alongside the X-Men when the Skrulls invaded San Francisco. He came across a Skrull bible and, after studying it, gave it to Beast, who figured out how to deal with the Skrulls.

X-Infernus

In the 2008 miniseries X-Infernus, Pixie summoned her Souldagger and stabbed Kurt in the chest, knocking him out. When Pixie removed her Souldagger, Magik's Soulsword emerged from his chest.

Magik teleported away after taking out Pixie, Mercury, Rockslide, and Beast. Kurt woke up and stopped Pixie from going after her, and Pixie broke down and apologized for stabbing him. Later, the X-Men gathered and Kurt was put in charge of a team of X-Men to go help save Magik.

Upon entering Limbo, Kurt, Mercury, Colossus, Rockslide, Pixie, and Wolverine fought their way through many demons. Pixie, Mercury, and Rockslide were horrified at how brutal the older X-Men were towards the demons. An octopus-type creature attacked Kurt until Pixie jumped in and killed it with her Souldagger.

Hearing the screams from the castle, Kurt teleported the X-Men into the throne room. Once there, Witchfire turned Colossus and Wolverine against Mercury and Rockslide. Kurt noticed Illyana chained to a pillar, and she asked him to stab her with Pixie's Souldagger, as it was the only way and he was the only one to do it because he was attuned to magic. He apologized and stabbed her; at that moment Colossus punched Kurt, and Witchfire finished making her fifth and final Bloodstone from the now demonic Pixie.

The fact, however, that Colossus and Wolverine hadn't killed him made Kurt realize they were not fully under her control. Using Pixie's Dagger, Kurt then pulled Illyana's Soulsword from her and used it to free Wolverine and Colossus of Witchfire's control. Unfortunately, the demon managed to use the Bloodstones to summon the Elder Gods. Through their combined efforts, the X-Men and Magik managed to banish both Witchfire and the Elder Gods, but not without losing four of the five Bloodstones. Furious at losing another part of her soul, Pixie fled. Being told by Illyana to let her go, Kurt consoled Magik about the theology of a soul, before she teleported them back to Earth. Kurt, along with Colossus, Cyclops, and the former New Mutants team, convinced her to stay with them and join the X-Men.

Necrosha
After mutants rose from the dead and attacked the island Utopia as part of the Necrosha storyline, Cyclops sent Nightcrawler to lead a team of X-Men consisting of Rogue, Trance, Magneto, Husk, Psylocke, Colossus, and Blindfold to investigate Muir Island. It was revealed that Proteus had been resurrected and had taken possession of Blindfold (who had the vision of going to Muir Island in the first place).

"Second Coming" and Death 
In the 2010 "X-Men: Second Coming" storyline, the X-Men traveled to Westchester when Cable and Hope were detected there. Nightcrawler's discovery of the lethal methods used by X-Force led to an argument between him and Cyclops. While teleporting during a battle with Bastion, Bastion extended his arm into the space in which Nightcrawler would materialize. Nightcrawler rematerialized around Bastion's arm, fusing with it. Though mortally wounded, he managed to teleport Hope to Utopia, telling her before expiring that he believed in her.

Afterlife
Despite his death, Nightcrawler continued to aid his friends. When Wolverine was possessed by a demon called the Hellverine, Nightcrawler entered his friend's mind to help him drive out the invader. The other X-Men who entered Logan's mind to help him assumed that Nightcrawler was just a manifestation of Wolverine's mind, rather than the real one.

Resurrection
Nightcrawler spent his sojourn in Heaven alongside Professor X, but despite enjoying paradise, Nightcrawler continued to feel as though he had unfinished business, remaining on the periphery rather than actually joining the heavenly choir. When Azazel mounted an attack on Heaven using his connection to Kurt as a door, Nightcrawler instructed a few Bamfs to create a portal to Heaven inside the Jean Grey School of Higher Learning, allowing him to summon the X-Men to aid him in his fight. Having gathered his friends, Kurt used the Bamfs and his connection to Azazel to restore himself to life back on Earth, thus preventing Azazel from attacking Heaven again by tying them both together, although this resulted in Kurt sacrificing his own soul to ensure that Azazel would not be able to return to Heaven. His 'Welcome Back' party is subsequently attended by all the X-Men, including Cyclops' branch of the team. Despite the tensions between them, Nightcrawler stated that he wanted all of his family to be present. Nightcrawler later left the party to confront Mystique when she was successfully freeing Azazel

With Storm's and Rachel's encouragement, Nightcrawler accepted a teaching position at the Jean Grey School, where he formed a bond with the pupil Scorpion Boy. While attempting to reunite with Amanda, he was duped by Margali to grant her sanctuary at the school, where she forcefully extracted the knowledge about the Beyond from Beast and Storm in order to open a portal to the Afterlife. Nightcrawler and Amanda managed to foil her but at the cost of Amanda getting stranded in the Void. Afterward, Nightcrawler and Scorpion Boy engaged the Crimson Pirates, who acted on behalf of Tullamore Voge, over the custody of a young mutant named Ziggy Karst, who subsequently joined the Jean Grey School. Soon afterward, Nightcrawler and Bloody Bess were forced to fight against their fellow Crimson Pirates and X-Men, all mind-controlled by the resurrected Shadow King. The fight ended with the Pirates kidnapping Ziggy and Scorpion Boy and fatally stabbing Nightcrawler; but on his way to the afterlife he was intercepted by Amanda, Wolverine and the Phoenix, who encouraged him to return. Together with Bess and the Bamfs, he traveled to Voge's interdimensional child slave market and rescued Ziggy and Scorpion Boy, battling Voge's henchmen and the Warwolves. In the end, they defeated Voge, breaking up his slavery racket, and returned the enslaved children, taking those orphaned by the slavers into the school

During the 2016 "Civil War II" storyline, both Storm and Magneto were having a conflict on their own to save mutantkind from the Terrigen Mist. Storm and the other X-Men who followed her decision to support Captain Marvel's side, to require the Inhumans' help to solve their kinds' extinction from breathing that mist. Nightcrawler decided to join Magneto and Iron Man's side He later joined Kitty Pryde's mutant school, and eventually he developed romantic feelings for his longtime friend and teammate Rachel

Krakoa
When the mutant colony of Krakoa was established, Kurt was given a position on the council, helping to shape the laws of this new mutant society.  However, Kurt's religious concerns led him to decide to form a mutant religion.

Powers and abilities
Kurt Wagner is a mutant whose primary mutant power is the ability to teleport himself, his clothing, and a certain amount of additional mass from one point to another virtually instantaneously. He does this by displacing himself through an alternate dimension briefly and reappearing in a desired, pre-selected location. He has been shown to be able to teleport distances of up to  under optimal conditions, although this is usually his outer limit, and he can become severely fatigued if he tries to teleport that distance; he has exceeded this limit on multiple occasions. Via coordinates received telepathically from Professor Xavier, Nightcrawler has teleported an unknown (but presumably large) distance. Nightcrawler's teleportation ability is also affected by direction—north-south along Earth's "magnetic lines of force" is easier than east–west against them.

His effective teleport range was extended after his revival both due to outside assistance and a later enhancement to his powers, thanks to a deal he made with a demonic race of Bamfs loaned to him by his father. Nightcrawler can warp greater distances by locking onto them as a form of waypoint marker in order to teleport longer distances, even trans-dimensional ones. He possesses a limited unconscious extrasensory "spatial awareness" ability which prevents him from teleporting into solid objects within his immediate vicinity, but this ability diminishes the greater the distance he teleports. Because teleporting into other solid matter would cause severe injury or death, he will only teleport to an area he is familiar with or that he can clearly see at the time or has seen in the past. His power automatically displaces liquids and gases when he arrives.

The process of teleportation places a strain on his endurance and that of any passengers; carrying mass other than his body and clothing when teleporting adds additional strain to his body. Through practice, he has been able to teleport with a passenger over a long distance without exhausting himself. Extensive training has raised his tolerance for teleportation, but most of his passengers lack this tolerance. Therefore, one of his tactics is to grab opponents and make several quick teleportations with them. They usually become weakened or even pass out from the strain.

After Nightcrawler teleports, he leaves behind the smoke and a faint scent of burning brimstone; this is a small portion of the atmosphere of the dimension through which he travels when he teleports. His teleportation power is due to a biophysical/biochemical reaction he consciously triggers within himself. A loud "bamf" noise is always present whenever he teleports (being the sound of air rushing to fill the space he was just occupying). His teleporting also causes a slight change in the atmosphere before he arrives, although only superhumans with heightened senses such as Daredevil can detect it.

In addition to his primary power of teleportation, Nightcrawler's physiology is unique in several different ways. His agility far surpasses that of an Olympic-level gymnast, and his bone structure allows him great flexibility. His spine is more flexible than an ordinary human, enabling him to remain in a crouched position for a long time and perform contortionist-type feats without causing any damage to his spine. Nightcrawler's balance and bodily coordination are all enhanced to superhuman levels. He has the ability to cling to surfaces through microscopic suction cups located on the pads of his hands and feet. He also possesses superhuman dexterity, being able to manipulate items and fence with either hand, both feet, and his tail.

He has the ability to blend into shadows, both as a result of his indigo fur, and the dimensional portal which always surrounds his body and absorbs photons. At one point shortly after his initial introduction, it was suggested that he could actually travel through shadows (in much the same way Psylocke did after exposure to the Crimson Dawn) and this was shown in Bizarre Adventures, but never really touched upon after that. In the story, Vanisher removes some of the Darkforce that formed his costume and threw it at Kurt, who disappeared. He then reappeared from within the Darkforce on the ground, saying that it was like "a pool of shadow" and that he "fell right through it".

Nightcrawler has a prehensile tail, allowing him to grab onto objects with relative ease. His tail is strong enough to not only support his body weight, but also lift an adult man completely off the ground at the same time, and is deft enough to fight with while holding a sword or blunt object. Nightcrawler's eyes (which are constantly glowing) grant him a marked degree of heightened night vision.

Aside from the abilities granted by his mutation, Nightcrawler is a superb fencer and a very skilled hand-to-hand combatant, to the point of being able to stalemate super-beings as powerful as Captain Britain. He has also served as the team's pilot and medic when more qualified X-Men were not around to do so. He and Wolverine were also the mechanics of the X-Men's Blackbird jet for a long time. He is also recognized by other Marvel characters as the leading authority on teleportation, with Spider-Man and Daredevil contacting him for information and advice following their first encounter with Francis Klum. Nightcrawler deduced from analysis of photographs of a crime scene that a man had been killed by someone else teleporting inside the victim, despite having never witnessed such a thing before.

For a long period, Kurt's body housed the Soulsword. Magik states that Kurt is attuned to magic and thus able to wield her Soulsword and Pixie's Souldagger.

As an aftereffect of his death and resurrection, Nightcrawler has developed a heightened resistance against psychic domination which helped him resist the Shadow King's telepathic powers, even after the latter had possessed such strong minds as Rachel Grey and Psylocke moments before. With the loss of his soul, he has also been rendered quasi-immortal, although he still feels the pain of any injuries inflicted upon him.

Family relations
X-Men writer Chris Claremont had intended to reveal that Nightcrawler was the son of Nightmare early in his run. Roger Stern recounted, "It happened when I was the writer of Dr. Strange, back when writers were still occasionally listened to. Chris had come up with the latest of several crazy ideas and declared that Nightcrawler's father was Nightmare. And I replied with something like, 'No, he's not. I'm not going to let you appropriate one of my character's major villains.' As I recall, Len Wein crossed the room and shook my hand. And not too long after, I [became] the X-Men editor and was able to make sure that didn't happen for long enough that Chris eventually changed his mind." Claremont's new plan was for the mutant terrorist Mystique and her lover Destiny to have been Nightcrawler's biological parents. Mystique, being a shapeshifter, would have taken the form of a man and impregnated Destiny. However, Marvel felt the idea to be too controversial and an alternative origin was developed.

After hinting for many years that Mystique was indeed Nightcrawler's biological mother, it was confirmed by writer Scott Lobdell in X-Men Unlimited #4. In 2003, it was revealed that although Mystique was married to a wealthy German, Herr Wagner, Nightcrawler's father was Azazel, a member of a race of demonic-looking mutants known as the Neyaphem which date back to Biblical times that were banished to another dimension by a race of angelic mutants. The storyline was furthered by the revelation that fellow X-Man Archangel's healing blood did not heal Nightcrawler, and in fact caused him great pain.

Nightcrawler's siblings include his adoptive sister Rogue and half-brother Graydon Creed by Mystique; and Abyss and Kiwi Black from Azazel.

It is also revealed that in a parallel universe, an alternate Nightcrawler fathered a daughter with an alternate Scarlet Witch; this girl, named Nocturne, is a dimensionally-stranded mutant bearing traits similar to Nightcrawler himself. Nocturne has since referred to Nightcrawler as her father. The demeanor of Nightcrawler is very similar to that of the Nightcrawler from Nocturne's reality, so the two developed a close bond that resembles a father-daughter relationship.

Characteristics
Nightcrawler is a mutant born with fine blue-black fur covering his body, two fingers with an opposable thumb on each hand and only two toes, each longer than a normal human being's, on each foot and a third toe-like projection on his heel, as well as pronounced, fang-like canine teeth, yellow eyes, pointed ears, and a  prehensile pointed tail which can support his weight.

Among his more ironic character traits, Wagner is an extremely religious man. A devout Catholic, his demonic appearance obviously makes it very difficult to attend Mass. Despite this, as mutants in the Marvel Universe become more accepted, he even managed to almost become a Catholic priest; unfortunately, his studies were interrupted by a villainous group known as "The Neo".

In contrast, Nightcrawler also has a knack for the spontaneous and exciting. He sees himself as a swashbuckler, usually comparing himself to Errol Flynn. He is, despite his looks, always charming and gallant, and several storylines contain Kurt's love life as a conflict to his religious nature. His days in the circus make him a gifted performer and showman. Kurt is also a jokester. He has a great sense of humor for someone in his situation. He always plays pranks on people; some even call him "Trickster" because his combined teleporting abilities and playful disposition enable him to play quite the joke.

Wagner has used a personal holographic device called an image-inducer on several occasions to produce a holographic image of himself as an ordinary human (occasionally Errol Flynn himself) so that he might interact with non-mutants in a normal fashion. After losing a bet with his friend Wolverine, however, Nightcrawler was made to walk through town in his normal form for all to see. To his shock, the reaction of the average person on the street was simply one of startling interest. He was even able to sneak a kiss from a surprised, but unafraid woman. Kurt was, eventually, attacked by a carload of anti-mutant bigots, but he prevented Wolverine from tearing them to shreds, preferring to be merciful to the ignorant. The entire experience emboldened him, and he has since largely forsaken the use of this device, using it only when absolutely necessary.

Reception
Nightcrawler has received positive reception as a comic book character and as a member of the X-Men. Nightcrawler was ranked as the 133rd-greatest comic book character of all time by Wizard magazine. IGN also ranked Nightcrawler as the 80th-greatest comic book hero of all time describing Nightcrawler as a mutant with the appearance of a demon and the heart of a preacher; IGN also states that as the X-Men enter one of their most uncertain periods, his legacy still looms large. In 2006, IGN also rated Nightcrawler at #7 on their list of top 25 X-Men from the past forty years stating that religion is one of the few commonalities that could bring mutants and humans together and it is through his faith that Nightcrawler has stayed true to the X-Men for so long. In 2008, Marvel rated their top ten X-Men of all time. Nightcrawler ranked #4 on their list stating that far from a character consumed by doom and gloom, Nightcrawler's chivalry, a flair for the dramatic and sense of humor have made him one of the most likable X-Men ever, a character you genuinely look forward to seeing leap into action. In 2013, ComicsAlliance ranked Nightcrawler as #19 on their list of the "50 Sexiest Male Characters in Comics".

 In 2014, Entertainment Weekly ranked Nightcrawler 5th in their "Let's rank every X-Man ever" list.

In 2018, CBR.com ranked Nightcrawler 28th in their "Age Of Apocalypse: The 30 Strongest Characters In Marvel's Coolest Alternate World" list.

Other versions

Age of Apocalypse
In the Age of Apocalypse miniseries, Nightcrawler is similar to his Earth-616 counterpart, but much darker and more violent, and he carries two sabers at all times, denoting his skills as a swordsman. Another important difference is that this Nightcrawler hates churches, having had a traumatic experience when he was younger. Nightcrawler is close to his mother, Mystique, and he even calls her "Mom." Nightcrawler is sent by Magneto to Avalon, an Antarctic utopia where humans and mutants peacefully coexist, to bring Destiny back to the United States to confirm Bishop's claims. While there, Avalon is attacked by Apocalypse's Pale Riders. Nightcrawler and Mystique vow to protect Avalon from the Pale Riders and are joined by fellow mutants Switchback and former Pale Rider Damask to face the Shadow King. Nightcrawler also goes by Kurt Darkholme instead of Kurt Wagner in this reality.

The AOA Nightcrawler appears to always be "breathing fire" when teleporting. Presumably this is simply an optical illusion of his teleportation powers, as it does not appear to have any adverse effects on anything Kurt comes in contact with as he does so. Also, this version seemingly believes his biological father is Sabretooth as is evidenced by Mystique stating that she had gone to the trouble of "finding a father with fur" when Nightcrawler complains he is cold and, when the Shadow King possesses Mystique, the captions reveal "one memory is more interesting than the others" and flashes to Sabretooth taunting Nightcrawler.

After the events of the Dark Angel Saga, AoA Nightcrawler chooses to remain in the 616 reality and join X-Force. Searching for the Sugar Man, Dark Beast, Iceman and Blob, Kurt promises to "kill the bastards who ruined our lives". He is openly hostile concerning being mistaken with his alternative self; at one point he roughly shoves Kitty aside when she mistakes him for a returned-from-the-dead main universe Nightcrawler, declaring that he is not back and does not know her.

He has successfully killed Blob by teleporting a shark into his stomach which devoured Blob from the inside and he has executed Iceman by leading him into a factory boiler room where the weakened Iceman begged for forgiveness. Nightcrawler proceeded to throw his former friend into the factory fire to his death. He has also made several unsuccessful attempts on Dark Beast's life.

This version of Nightcrawler demonstrated the ability to control how much of another person traveled with him when teleporting, allowing him to kill a man by teleporting only his head.

In March 2013, X-Treme X-Men, Age of Apocalypse, and Astonishing X-Men participated in the "X-Termination" crossover, which focuses on the AoA Nightcrawler's attempt to get to his home universe. During the event, the AoA reality seemingly is destroyed with Nightcrawler in it.

Bamf
In The Uncanny X-Men #153 Kitty Pryde tells Illyana a bedtime story. In it she casts him as a cute creature called "Bamf". He is only two feet tall and looks like a super deformed version of Kurt, even right down to his costume. He is fun-loving and somewhat lecherous. At first he only existed in a Fairy Tale, but Kurt himself met Bamf and the other characters from pale Kitty's story during an accidental interdimensional trip. It soon turns out there are multiple Bamfs, including female versions; the Bamfs even declared him their "Daddy". The Bamfs later let their affection for Kitty Pryde get the best of them and even resorted to endangering Kitty's pet dragon Lockheed.

Days of Future Past
Nightcrawler is dead in the alternative timeline Earth-811, but he had a daughter known as Blue. She inherited the power to teleport herself and others, and a similar appearance.

Exiles
Nocturne is a member of the alternative-reality traveling Exiles, and a former member of New Excalibur. Like all members of the Exiles she is from an alternative dimension. In her dimension the Scarlet Witch married Nightcrawler, and Nocturne is their daughter.

In her reality, Charles Xavier was attacked by a Shadow King-controlled Wolverine. Although the Shadow King was expelled from Wolverine's mind, Xavier was fatally wounded in the attack and Logan was left crippled. Shortly after, Jean Grey died and Cyclops, blaming Wolverine for both deaths, abandoned the team, leaving Wolverine and Nightcrawler as the leaders of the X-Men and the Xavier Institute.

The demeanor of this Nightcrawler is very similar to that of the Earth-616 Nightcrawler, so the first time that Nocturne met 616-Nightcrawler she accidentally calls him "Dad." In subsequent meetings Nocturne and 616-Nightcrawler have developed a bond similar to a father-daughter relationship.

House of M
In the House of M reality, Nightcrawler appears as a member of S.H.I.E.L.D.'s Red Guard, a task force of elite mutants designed to quell insurrections; Nightcrawler has a small role when the Red Guard attempts to track down their leader, Wolverine, who remembers the world before the Scarlet Witch changed reality. Nightcrawler also appears in World of M, where he attempts to aid Apocalypse when the latter is under attack by Namor, Storm, and Sunfire.

Kurt Waggoner
A Brooklyn boy on his world, Kurt is a fan of Spider-Man. He was taken from his world by force, an event he will not talk about as it resulted in the death of someone close to him. He was held by the forces of the Saviour until rescued through the efforts of Scott Summers. Kurt fought to save the multiverse as part of a cross-dimension X-Men team in X-Treme X-Men but was killed trying to save the team in the X-Termination event.

Marvel Zombies: Dead Days
In the Marvel Zombies universe at Earth 2149, where the superhero population gradually becomes infected by a zombie virus, Nightcrawler is among the remaining uninfected superheroes attempting to save what remains of the Earth population. Unfortunately, he is bitten by the zombie Fantastic Four in the one-shot Marvel Zombies: Dead Days, and is one of the last superheroes to be infected. When the Ultimate version of Reed Richards travels to the Marvel Zombies Universe, Nightcrawler is among the zombified superheroes who attack him in the ruins of New York, but the attempt failed. Zombie Nightcrawler also appears in Marvel Zombies vs. The Army Of Darkness, whereas he is seen as a zombie also, attempting to attack the fortress of the villain known as Dr. Doom.

Misfits
In the Amerimanga series X-Men Misfits, Kurt's design is radically different with talon-like claws instead of toes and a metal tail.

Old Man Logan
In the "Old Man Logan" storyline, Nightcrawler is among the X-Men who perish at the hands of Wolverine when he is tricked by Mysterio into believing his friends are super-villains attacking the mansion.

Ruins
In Warren Ellis' Ruins, Kurt Wagner/Nightcrawler is seen of the deformed mutants jailed at a prison in Texas where he is seen gnawing on his own tail.

Secret Wars

Limbo Domain
A member of the X-Men, Nightcrawler battled the Limbo's Demon Horde when it assaulted Manhattan. The X-Men failed both to repel them and to save Illyana Rasputin from N'Astirh. The invasion was then contained behind a wall which split the domain in two.
As part of a deal with Scott Summers, Illyana's brother Colossus would assemble a team once a year, on the invasion's anniversary, to try to retrieve Illyana. Nightcrawler's part of the mission was to pick a drop zone and teleport them in. When Scott informed Colossus that he refused to send a team to the demon domain, since the last time, both Scott and Colossus were crippled in the fight, Nightcrawler and Kitty Pryde refused to let Colossus down and offered him a last chance. Kurt, along with Boomer and Colossus' girlfriend Domino, formed the team. Teleporting in the demon domain, the team was soon attacked, and separated, with Kurt rescuing Boomer from winged demons. Back on the ground, Darkchild and N'Astirh appeared, capturing Nightcrawler and leaving Boomer mortally wounded.

Imprisoned, he was tortured and his soul was corrupted by Darkchild, turning him into a massive demon under her control. Darkchild used Nightcrawler to pass the force field and assaulted the X-Men controlled area of Inferno.
The "Bamf Dragon" (as called by Scott, unaware it was actually Nightcrawler) caused great damages while battling the X-Men. As the science and magic teams quitted their post to assist the X-Men, Illyana and Kurt teleported inside the building to target the force field, maintained only by Hank McCoy and Strange. They were both killed and the field dropped out, letting all of Inferno's demons enter Manhattan. "Bamfy" later wandered through the streets with Darkchild, as the Demon Horde rampaged the city. "Bamfy" found the last X-Men survivors in a subway tunnel, and teleported N'Astirh and many demons. The team sent in Inferno returned along the Goblin Queen and her subjects, and rescued the X-Men. As Jean Grey had Bamfy immobilized and tried to connect with him, Madelyne stepped in and put him under her own control claiming that Kurt's mind had been destroyed when Darkchild turned him into a massive dragon.

After Sinister proposed an alliance to the X-Men and the Goblin Queen, providing himself an army of demon/mutant hybrid clones made from Boomer's DNA, Madelyne avenged herself by controlling Boomer to kill him. The clones consequently turned against the Goblin Queen, who was then protected by Bamfy. With all the X-Men either dead or on the run, Madelyne, still accompanied by Bamfy, usurped the Hellfire energies from Darkchild's corpse, and became the new Baron of the domain.

All-New, All-Different Marvel
After the end of the Battleworld, Bamfy along with the Goblin Queen and her Goblin Horde, managed to access Prime Earth.

Ultimate Marvel
The Ultimate version of Nightcrawler (Kurt Wagner) is a much more militant young mutant, only fourteen years old when first introduced. His first appearances have him forced to battle the X-Men alongside a team of Weapon X agents.

He had been captured by Weapon X and forced to act as an assassin and black ops agent. His Weapon X origins link him more closely with Wolverine and Rogue than other teammates. Originally speaking only German, he learned to speak English with the help of Jean Grey's mental powers. Though Nightcrawler returns home after he escapes from Weapon X, he soon joined the X-Men to fight Magneto.

Nightcrawler is originally portrayed as a friendly, humorous man with a zest for high adventure that has gained him the friendship of many fellow X-Men. One of Kurt's closest friends was Angel, with whom he "misused" the Danger Room for Pirates of the Caribbean-like "role-playing" sessions under the name of "the dread Captain Blue Tail," as it is shown that he is a fan of the movie. He has a fan-crush on Keira Knightley.

When Dazzler, Kurt's unrequited love, slips into a coma due to injuries inflicted by Deathstrike, Kurt begins to lose control of his delicate psyche, regressing to his Weapon X days. His loneliness is exacerbated by Angel's departure from the X-Men, and by the breakdown in his relationship with Colossus after Colossus reveals his sexual orientation.

Shortly following Dazzler's awakening, Kurt's irrational, increasing obsession with Dazzler prompted him to teleport her to a secluded cave, telling her that the X-Men had been attacked and that he was protecting her. The X-Men rescued Dazzler and, learning what he had done, confronted Kurt, resulting in a battle. Kurt was defeated and placed in a vegetative state by Charles Xavier in the hopes that Xavier could treat Kurt's damaged psyche. At his bedside, Rogue, who had absorbed his memories during the battle, told him she now considered him as much a monster on the inside as he appeared on the outside. Whether this was in regard to his Weapon X assassin activities or something else remains to be seen.

After Xavier was kidnapped by the time-traveling Cable, his hold on Kurt was broken, and Kurt vanished from the Xavier Institute. In issue #80 he saves Pyro from the Friends of Humanity. Pyro reveals the existence of the Morlocks. Nightcrawler is captured by the Morlocks, who believe he is a spy for Xavier. Shortly, the X-Men arrive to search for Toad, who was sent as an emissary. A fight ensues. During the battle, Nightcrawler helps his former teammates and subdues Sunder, the leader of the Morlocks. He decides to stay with the Morlocks since they were physically mutated like him. They elect him their new leader. When Sinister targets the Morlocks for sacrifices in his attempts to summon Apocalypse, Nightcrawler joins in the fight.

Kurt returns to Xavier's on occasion to hang out with his former teammates and slowly starts to accept Colossus' homosexuality, even standing up for him when the X-Men discover that Colossus has been using a drug called "Banshee" to give him super-strength. Kurt is also seen to be part of Colossus' Banshee (Ultimatevers's Mutant Growth Hormone) enhanced X-Men team. In this form, Nightcrawler seems to wield flare/batons of energy, similar to Blink's javelins.

Ultimate Nightcrawler's powers are very similar to his 616 counterpart. Kurt's demon-like physiology grants him dark, indigo skin (unlike the 616 version in which he is covered with a thin blue fur), a prehensile tail, superhuman acrobatic ability, and control over bonding between his molecules, which allows him to cling to any surface. Most notably, Nightcrawler can teleport short distances (although one teleport of two miles (3 km) was noted), leaving a burst of yellow smoke and flames. After use of the drug Banshee, Nightcrawler bursts purple (rather than yellow) smoke and flames when he teleports.

While heading to a theater with Angel, Beast, and Dazzler, Kurt is killed when the Ultimatum wave hits New York.

According to Nick Spencer, Nightcrawler will somehow be a supporting character in Ultimate Comics: X-Men.

Universe X (Belasco)
In the futuristic Universe X maxi-series by Jim Krueger and Alex Ross, it is revealed that Nightcrawler became amnesiac and was displaced in time, finally becoming Belasco, a long-time enemy of the X-Men. After his origins are revealed to him by a resurrected Captain Marvel, Nightcrawler/Belasco finally joins the good guys again.

It was originally stated in the original Earth X series that after surviving the tragedy that killed the rest of Excalibur, Nightcrawler lost his teleportation powers and eventually became human. In an ironic twist of fate, he was then killed by a group of superhumans affected by the Terrigen Mists for being human.

What If?
Nightcrawler has made a number of appearances through the years in the What If? series, consisting of one-issue takes on potential alternative universes. Among his roles were What if the X-Men had stayed in Asgard? vol. 2 #12, in which Nightcrawler stayed behind on Asgard to be a swashbuckler and eventually joined the Warriors Three.

In What if the all-new, all-different X-Men had never existed?, an embittered Nightcrawler, having never been recruited by Professor Xavier, was talked into a life of crime by Erik the Red. However, after learning the truth about the X-Men, he sacrificed himself to destroy the Phoenix Force that was hiding in Earth's sun, reasoning that, while heroes like the X-Men would be mourned by the world, nobody would miss him.

In "What If Mystique had raised Nightcrawler?", Rogue's attempt to free Nightcrawler from the attic where Mystique had kept him to 'protect' him resulted in him being mortally injured by the Brotherhood when they mistook him for an X-Man, Rogue's attempt to use his power to escape results in her permanently absorbing Nightcrawler's powers and appearance due to the prolonged contact she maintained.

X-Men Forever
In this reality, Rogue has absorbed Nightcrawler's abilities when he gave her mouth-to-mouth, granting her Nightcrawler's skin and tail as well as exceptional athletic abilities, and leaving Nightcrawler with Rogue's powers and looking like a normal human. He was left in a coma after he absorbed Thor's powers during a fight with the Avengers, his body unable to cope with the strain of absorbing the power of a god, although Thor promised Mystique and Rogue that he would find a way to help Nightcrawler recover.

X-Men Noir
Nightcrawler appears in the sequel to X-Men Noir, X-Men Noir: the Mark of Cain. The characters in the setting do not have superpowers and Kurt is a human wearing a blue demon mask and a costume tail. He was an acrobat with sharpened nails.

X-Men: The End
Additionally, in X-Men: The End, he is shown to be a famous Hollywood action star (with Jubilee as his agent), and is married to Kymri; the pair have children, including another T.J. Wagner (which is Nocturne's name) however, in this timeline T.J. Wagner is a male. Nocturne is a character in this universe.

X-2: X-Men United
A tie-in comic to the 2003 film X-2: X-Men United depicts his background as a circus performer, where he was in love with Amanda Sefton, a fellow performer. When Amanda falls from her trapeze, Kurt breaks character and teleports to save her, breaking his own ribs in the process. Unconcerned with his injuries, Kurt learns that Amanda is involved with Werner, a more traditionally handsome performer, and goes to a church to grieve.  While there, he's confronted by Amanda, confessing her love to him and inviting him to elope. In fact, she is an illusion created by Mutant 12, who guides him to a Weapon X facility.

Marvel Mangaverse
In Marvel Mangaverse Nightcrawler is a member of the Brotherhood, led by Amanda Sefton, and an enemy of the X-Men and has a rivalry with Wolverine. Nightcrawler is killed by Wolverine.

In other media

Television
 Nightcrawler appears in the Spider-Man and His Amazing Friends episode "The X-Men Adventure", voiced by G. Stanley Jones.
 Nightcrawler appears in Pryde of the X-Men, voiced by Neil Ross.
 Nightcrawler is featured in the episodes "Nightcrawler" and "Bloodlines" of X-Men, voiced by Adrian Hough. He is shown as a monk in a Swiss abbey, persecuted by one of his superiors and the townspeople who believe him to be a demon. Nightcrawler also makes brief appearances in the episodes "Repo Man" and "One Man's Worth, Part I".
 Nightcrawler is one of the main characters in X-Men: Evolution, voiced by Brad Swaile. He is much younger in this incarnation, a student at the Xavier Institute who is insecure about his appearance. He develops a long-standing romance with human Amanda Sefton, though unlike the comics, the two have no prior relationship as "siblings". As the comics, it is revealed that Mystique is his birth mother and Rogue is his adopted sister.
 Nightcrawler is a recurring character in Wolverine and the X-Men, voiced by Liam O'Brien. At the beginning of the series, he leaves the X-Men when they disband, and he is later seen helping mutant refugees traveling on pirate ships. He enters into a romantic relationship with the Scarlet Witch, and eventually rejoins the X-Men.
 Nightcrawler appears in episode 5 of Black Panther, voiced by Nolan North. He is seen with Cyclops, Storm, and Wolverine when they find out that Juggernaut is taking part in the invasion of Wakanda.
 Nightcrawler appears in the Wolverine: Weapon X motion comic, voiced by Trevor Devall.

Film

 In one of the early scripts of X-Men, written by Michael Chabon, Nightcrawler was included, but was cut when the script was scrapped.
 Nightcrawler appears in X2, portrayed by Alan Cumming. Nightcrawler is brainwashed, with fluid from William Stryker's mutant son, Jason, to attempt an assassination on the President of the United States. He helps the X-Men infiltrate Stryker's base on Alkali Lake.
 According to director Bryan Singer, Nightcrawler was intended to appear in X-Men: Days of Future Past, but he felt "that we were forcing too many mutants into the story."
 A younger Nightcrawler appears in X-Men: Apocalypse, portrayed by Kodi Smit-McPhee. Initially forced to compete in mutant cage fights against Angel, he is rescued by Raven. During the X-Men's climactic battle against Apocalypse, Nightcrawler saves Xavier from Apocalypse's attempted mind transfer, and later rescues the team from a crashing jet, at the cost of his consciousness. Smit-McPhee reprises the role in a brief cameo in Deadpool 2, and appears in the sequel Dark Phoenix.

Video games
 Nightcrawler has appeared in a number of video games such as: X-Men for the NES, X-Men: Madness in Murderworld, the X-Men arcade game, X-Men, X-Men 2: Clone Wars, X-Men: Mutant Academy 2, and X-Men: Next Dimension. In X-Men: Next Dimension, Nightcrawler can teleport toward, behind, or above the opponent, following it with any attack he chooses. He also carries a large sword he uses to deadly effect. Nightcrawler's incredible acrobatic attacks rival the other agile fighters greatly, which include Beast and Toad.
 He is one of the three playable characters in X-Men: The Official Game, which fills is set in between the films X2 and X-Men: The Last Stand. He is voiced by Alan Cumming, who portrayed him in X2. He takes a sabbatical from the X-Men at the conclusion of the game to return to Germany, as he feels that he is fundamentally a man of peace.
 Nightcrawler appears as a playable character in X-Men Legends and its sequel X-Men Legends II: Rise of Apocalypse, voiced by Dee Bradley Baker. Nightcrawler's powers include powerful sword attacks and the ability to teleport short distances.
 Dee Bradley Baker reprises his role of Nightcrawler in Marvel: Ultimate Alliance. He appears as an NPC across all platforms, and as a downloadable playable character for the Xbox 360 version of the game. In the game, he and Jean Grey are abducted by the Masters of Evil. While Jean is taken to Murderworld, Nightcrawler remains in Latveria, and is forced to teleport to Mephisto's Realm when subjected to the Mutant Amplifier.
 Nightcrawler appears in the PlayStation 2, Nintendo DS, and PSP versions of Spider-Man: Web of Shadows, voiced by Yuri Lowenthal. In the PS2 and PSP versions, he is an assist character who will teleport across the screen to defeat enemies. In the DS version, the player is able to play alongside Nightcrawler and take advantage of his unique powers.
 Nightcrawler is a playable character in the Marvel Super Hero Squad video game, voiced by Liam O'Brien.
 Nightcrawler has a cameo in Trish and Magneto's endings in Marvel vs. Capcom 3: Fate of Two Worlds. In the game's re-release, Ultimate Marvel vs. Capcom 3, he appears as a card in Heroes and Heralds mode, granting users a teleporting airdash.
 Nightcrawler appears in X-Men: Destiny, voiced again by Yuri Lowenthal.
 Nightcrawler is a playable character in Marvel Super Hero Squad Online.
 Nightcrawler is a playable character in the Facebook game Marvel: Avengers Alliance.
 Nightcrawler is a playable character in Marvel Heroes, voiced again by Liam O'Brien.
 Nightcrawler is a playable character in Marvel Contest of Champions.
 Nightcrawler is a playable character in the match-three mobile and PC game Marvel Puzzle Quest. The addition of both Nightcrawler and Gambit to the game was revealed during Rogue's official introduction in September 2017.
 Nightcrawler appears as a playable character in Marvel Ultimate Alliance 3: The Black Order, voiced again by Liam O'Brien.

Music
Nightcrawler is mentioned in the Weezer song "In the Garage", along with his ally Kitty Pryde.

Books
Nightcrawler appears in the X-Men/Star Trek crossover novel Planet X. In it, Geordi La Forge determines that his teleportation ability works by sending Nightcrawler through the same subspace dimension as warp drive. When the Enterprise is attacked by an unknown enemy ship, Nightcrawler proves key to their victory when his ability allows him to teleport himself and Data onto the enemy ship, whose shields are up, something that transporters cannot do.

Collected editions

First series

Second series

Way of X

References

External links
 Nightcrawler at Marvel.com
 Nightcrawlers v2.0 – Nightcrawler community that was often visited by Dave Cockrum
 UncannyXmen.net Spotlight on Nightcrawler

Catholic Church in popular culture
Characters created by Dave Cockrum
Characters created by Len Wein
Comics characters introduced in 1975
Excalibur (comics)
Fictional acrobats
Fictional characters from Baden-Württemberg
Fictional Christians
Fictional circus performers
Fictional half-demons
Fictional immigrants to the United States
Fictional pranksters
Fictional priests and priestesses
Fictional schoolteachers
Fictional swordfighters in comics
Fictional taekwondo practitioners
Marvel Comics characters who can teleport
Marvel Comics demons
Marvel Comics film characters
Marvel Comics hybrids
Marvel Comics male superheroes
Marvel Comics martial artists
Marvel Comics mutants
Romani comics characters
Superheroes who are adopted
X-Men members

de:Figuren aus dem Marvel-Universum#Nightcrawler